The Forest Is Our Heritage (Swedish: Skogen är vår arvedel) is a 1944 Swedish drama film directed by Ivar Johansson and starring Erik 'Bullen' Berglund, Birgit Tengroth and Sven Magnusson. It was shot at the Centrumateljéerna Studios in Stockholm. The film's sets were designed by the art director Bertil Duroj.

Cast
 Erik 'Bullen' Berglund as Per Jonsson 
 Birgit Tengroth as 	Märta Jonsson
 Sven Magnusson as Nisse Lund
 Birger Åsander as 	Vikman
 Helge Karlsson as 	Carlsson
 John Elfström as 	Larsson
 Artur Rolén as 	Hurtig
 Eric Laurent as 	Levin
 Åke Uppström as 	Roos
 Stig Johanson as 	Bredberg
 Ingemar Holde as 	Ferm
 Siegfried Fischer as 	Kallman
 Sten Lindgren as 	Engineer Karlmark
 Börje Mellvig as 	Engineer Hellgren
 Tekla Sjöblom as Hilda
 Artur Cederborgh as Maans Bleking

References

Bibliography 
 Qvist, Per Olov & von Bagh, Peter. Guide to the Cinema of Sweden and Finland. Greenwood Publishing Group, 2000.

External links 
 

1944 films
Swedish drama films
1944 drama films
1940s Swedish-language films
Films directed by Ivar Johansson
Swedish black-and-white films
1940s Swedish films